Sport-Vereinigung Schwechat is an Austrian association football club from the capital city of Vienna. They are currently playing in the Wiener Stadtliga and plays their home games at the Rudolf-Tonn-Stadion in Schwechat.

History

Founding
Sport-Vereinigung Schwechat was founded on August 22, 1903 under the name Allgemeinen-Sportklub-Schwechat (ASK Schwechat).

Names
 1903-1907 ASK Schwechat 
 1907-1927 SC Germania Schwechat (merged with SK Graphia Vienna)
 1927-1934 SK Neukettenhof
 1934-1945 SC Germania Schwechat (merged with Amateurs XI)
 1945-1979 1. Schwechat SC (merged with Phoenix Schwechat)
 1979-pres. SV Schwechat

Players

Current squad

Out on loan

Coaching staff

Coach history

Past seasons

References

External links
 Official website 

 
Football clubs in Austria
Football clubs in Vienna
Association football clubs established in 1903
1903 establishments in Austria